is a single-member electoral district for the House of Representatives, the lower house of the National Diet of Japan. It represents Shiribeshi Subprefecture of Hokkaido, including the city of Otaru, as well as Teine Ward and a portion of Nishi Ward of Sapporo city.

List of representatives

Recent results

References 

Politics of Hokkaido
Districts of the House of Representatives (Japan)